Mussa Azzan Zungu (born 25 May 1952) is a Tanzanian CCM politician and Member of Parliament for Ilala constituency since 2005. He has continued to retain the parliamentary seat in 2010 & 2015. He was appointed as the Minister of State in the Vice President's office on January 24, 2020 and server for 6 months before the parliament was dissolved on June 16, 2020.He is now the Deputy Speaker following the resignation of the former Speaker Job Ndugai, and the, by then, Deputy Speaker Dr. Tulia Ackson elected to become to be the current Speaker of the Parliament.

References

1952 births
Living people
Tanzanian Muslims
Chama Cha Mapinduzi MPs
Tanzanian MPs 2005–2010
Tanzanian MPs 2010–2015
Tanzanian MPs 2015–2020
Tambaza Secondary School alumni